Sahitya Akademi Translation Prizes are given each year to writers for their outstanding translations work in the 24 languages, since 1989.

Recipients 
Following is the list of recipients of Sahitya Akademi translation prizes for their works written in Sanskrit. The award, as of 2019, consisted of 50,000.

See also 
 List of Sahitya Akademi Award winners for Sanskrit

References

External links 
 Akademi Translation Prizes For Sanskrit Language

Sahitya Akademi Prize for Translation
Indian literary awards